Cédric Pioline defeated Dominik Hrbatý in the final, 6–4, 7–6(7–3), 7–6(8–6) to win the singles tennis title at the 2000 Monte Carlo Masters.

Gustavo Kuerten was the defending champion, but lost in the first round to Karol Kučera.

Seeds

  Yevgeny Kafelnikov (second round)
  Gustavo Kuerten (first round)
  Magnus Norman (second round)
  Nicolás Lapentti (first round)
  Marcelo Ríos (first round)
  Thomas Enqvist (second round)
  Tim Henman (second round)
  Cédric Pioline (champion)
  Álex Corretja (quarterfinals)
  Greg Rusedski (first round)
  Younes El Aynaoui (first round, retired)
  Álbert Costa (quarterfinals)
  Tommy Haas (first round)
  Mark Philippoussis (first round)
  Mariano Zabaleta (second round)
  Stefan Koubek (first round)

Draw

Finals

Top half

Section 1

Section 2

Bottom half

Section 3

Section 4

External links
 Main draw

Singles